Carl Otto Müller (28 October 1901 – 28 December 1970) was a German painter. His work was part of the painting event in the art competition at the 1936 Summer Olympics.

References

1901 births
1970 deaths
20th-century German painters
20th-century German male artists
German male painters
Olympic competitors in art competitions
People from Coburg